Johnny Cymbal (born John Hendry Blair; February 3, 1945 – March 16, 1993) was a Scottish-born American songwriter, singer and record producer who had numerous hit records, including his signature song, "Mr. Bass Man".

Overview
During a 33-year career, Cymbal made an impact on popular music worldwide as a songwriter, singer, performer and record producer. During those years, in addition to his rock and roll anthem, "Mr. Bass Man", he was responsible for hit records including "Teenage Heaven", "Cinnamon" (Under the pseudonym "Derek"), "Mary in the Morning", "Rock Me Baby" and "I'm Drinking Canada Dry".

In 1963, with the hit "Mr. Bass Man", Cymbal was recognized as a teen star. (The crucial Bass Man part was sung uncredited by Ronnie Bright (1938–2015), who sang with the Cadillacs, the Valentines and, for 40 years, phase two of the Coasters.)  In 1973, Who bassist John Entwistle covered the song on his third solo album, Rigor Mortis Sets In. 

In New York state, Cymbal wrote and produced records for a number of artists, including Gene Pitney and Terri Gibbs (who had a big country crossover hit with "Somebody's Knockin'"). In early 1969, as the New York recording scene slowed dramatically, Cymbal and his writing/producing partner George Tobin moved their base to California. Initially, Austin Roberts, who was a singer as well as a writer, stayed in New York, but soon after they had settled into the West Coast, he joined them in Los Angeles. With the entrepreneurial Tobin running the business and Cymbal and Roberts creating the music, they were making what Roberts describes as "the record of the day" — they would write a song during the day, then go into the studio to record it that night — with either Cymbal and/or Roberts singing it. The next day, according to Roberts, "Tobin would go sell it to three different labels." That may be an exaggeration, but they certainly made a lot of music recording under names such as "Taurus" on Tower and "Brother John" on A&M.

Death
Cymbal died of a heart attack on March 16, 1993, at the age of 48.

Discography

Albums
 Mr. Bass Man (1963)
 Cymbal and Clinger (with Peggy Clinger) (1972)

Singles

Notes

References

External links
 
 
 
 
 [ Allmusic]

1945 births
1993 deaths
American male singer-songwriters
People from East Ayrshire
Scottish emigrants to the United States
Musicians from Nashville, Tennessee
20th-century American singers
Singer-songwriters from Tennessee
Capitol Records artists
Columbia Records artists
Kapp Records artists
MGM Records artists
20th-century American male singers